Snapwire is a platform that allows users to take photos and videos in response to a request for brands, publishers, small businesses, and creatives who seek images that fulfill certain requirements. Buyers post a creative image brief (called a Request) and photographers respond by submitting their photos through the Snapwire website or mobile app. Winning photographers are awarded and paid. Aside from Requests, Snapwire regularly runs creative Challenges concerning popular image needs. Challenges are curated by Snapwire and are open to the public.

Snapwire has a searchable library of photos called the Marketplace, which consists of hand-selected images with varying price points. In July 2014 the number of photos in Marketplace had reached 150,000; in October 2014 this number exceeded 500,000 images. As of July, 2020 the company has over 5,000,000 images. Every photo on the Marketplace offers a royalty-free license where businesses may purchase to use them commercially.

History

In 2012, Chad Newell (Chief Executive Officer) and Sky Gilbar co-founded Snapwire Media Inc.

Chad Newell started working in the industry as a researcher at a stock photo library named Image Bank that was later acquired by Getty Images. In 2001 he co-founded Media Bakery – a premium stock photography agency with 10 million images aggregated from 170 sources that have all licensing models (macro stock, mid stock, and micro stock) and is one of the largest independent stock photo agencies in North America.

Snapwire opened to the public in March 2014. In July 2014 Snapwire launched 2.0 version, which allowed photographers to create personal portfolios and sell images from these. With its 2.0 version the company made a move towards becoming a photo sharing website. At the same time, Snapwire announced partnership with gram30 – a Japanese-based startup studio focusing on incubating and developing new products and services. In October 2014, Snapwire collaborated with Adobe to bring selected features of Adobe Photoshop CC and Lightroom to the Snapwire iOS app. The application was revealed at Adobe MAX 2014 show in Los Angeles. On October 1 the company opened its first international office in Tokyo.

Funding

About three months after the company's formal launch in March 2014, it had secured a $1.4 million seed round, with investor Sadato Tanaka. Other notable users include Alan Meckler, Allen Morgan, Tom Glocer, Safa Rashtchy, Scott Jarus, Chaotic Investments, Roger Fishman, Dave Morgan, Spencer Huang, and Mark Kingdon. In August 2015, Snapwire completed a "testing the waters" campaign on equity crowdfunding platform SeedInvest to gauge interest from their users in investing in the company. In December 2016 the company successfully raised proceeds under the Title 3 of the Jumpstart Our Business Jobs Act on Startengine, which yielded net proceeds of approximately $168,000. In April 2017, the company successfully closed another round of equity crowdfunding of approximately $198,000 on Wefunder.

See also 
 List of crowdsourcing projects

References

External links 
 

Image-sharing websites
American photography websites
Online marketplaces of the United States